Frisco Bay  can refer to:

 Frisco Bay, Dillon Reservoir, Colorado
 San Francisco Bay, California